David Miranda may refer to:
 David Martins Miranda (1936–2015), Brazilian pastor
 David Miranda (cyclist) (born 1942), Salvadoran cyclist
 David Miranda (politician) (born 1985), Brazilian politician